Chinook School Division No. 211 is a school district headquartered in Swift Current, Saskatchewan.

In April 2017 the district was to eliminate the rough equivalent of nine teaching positions, as its budget was in a deficit of $6 million.

In the 2017–2018 school year, the district could have possibly cut some teacher positions due to a budget deficit from Saskatchewan authorities.

In 2018, Saskatchewan authorities were to give the district an extra $140,000 for the 2019-2020 fiscal year, though the district leadership stated more money was needed.

Schools

Burstall School
Cabri School 
CAMPS logo
Central School
Chinook Cyber School 
Chinook International Program 
Consul School 
Eastend School 
École Centennial School
Fairview School 
Fox Valley School 
Frontier School
Gull Lake School
Hazlet School 
Herbert School
Hodgeville School
Leader Composite School 
Maple Creek Composite School 
Maverick High School
O.M. Irwin School 
Ponteix School
Shaunavon High School
Shaunavon Public School 
Sidney Street School 
Stewart Valley School 
Success School
Swift Current Comprehensive High School
Tompkins School
Val Marie School 
Vanguard School 
Waldeck School
Wymark School

References

External links
 Chinook School Division
School districts in Saskatchewan